The 1946 Pennsylvania gubernatorial election was held on November 5, 1946. Republican Party nominee James H. Duff defeated Democratic Party nominee John S. Rice to become Governor of Pennsylvania. , this was the last time Philadelphia County voted for the Republican candidate.

Primary
The endorsed candidates for the two major parties each won by large margins, with Duff earning over three-quarters of the vote against outgoing Secretary of Highways John Shroyer of Shamokin and Rice winning by a similar margin over Mahanoy City businessman Henry Morris.

Major Party Candidates

Democratic
 John Rice, former President pro tempore of the Pennsylvania Senate (from Adams County)
running mate: John Dent, President pro tempore of the Pennsylvania Senate (from Westmoreland County)

Republican
Jim Duff, State Attorney General (from Allegheny County)
running mate: Dan Strickler, former State Representative and World War II general (from Lancaster County)

Campaign
A close confidant of popular outgoing Governor Ed Martin, who was running for a US Senate seat, Duff was the clear favorite throughout the campaign. Duff ran as a moderate progressive but also as a hardline anti-communist. He promised to address the key topic of labor strife by limiting strikes and cracking down on union criminal activity while concurrently increasing the minimum wage. Duff also vowed to spur innovation amongst the state's fragmented local governments.

Results

References

1946
Pennsylvania
Gubernatorial
November 1946 events in the United States